Mmoba Solomon "Solly" Malatsi (born 22 December 1985) is a South African politician from Limpopo. He has been a Member of the National Assembly of South Africa since May 2014 and the national spokesperson of the Democratic Alliance (DA) since August 2022, previously holding the position from June 2018 to November 2020. Malatsi was also the Parliamentary Counsellor to the DA Parliamentary Leader. He has also held posts in the DA's shadow cabinet.

Early life and education
Malatsi was born in Ga-Dikgale in the former Transvaal Province. He matriculated from Phiri Kolobe High School and went on to obtain a Bachelor of Administration from the University of Limpopo. Malatsi also achieved an Honours Degree in Political Studies from the University of the Witwatersrand. Malatsi is a graduate of the DA's Young Leaders Programme.

Political career
Malatsi became a parliamentary researcher for the DA in 2008. He then worked as a spokesperson for the Western Cape Provincial Minister of Transport and Public Works, Robin Carlisle, from 2009 to 2011. Between 2011 and 2014, he served as the spokesperson for Cape Town Mayor Patricia de Lille.

Parliamentary career 
In May 2014, he became an MP for the DA and was appointed as Shadow Minister of Sport and Recreation. He was later appointed as Shadow Minister of Human Settlements.

In June 2018, Malatsi was appointed as national spokesperson for the DA, succeeding Phumzile van Damme. He was re-elected for a second term as an MP in May 2019. He then became the party's Shadow Minister in the Presidency in June. In October 2019, he was appointed parliamentary counsellor to the newly elected DA parliamentary leader, John Steenhuisen.

On 24 November 2020, Malatsi stepped down as the DA's national spokesperson. Malatsi was reappointed to the shadow cabinet as Shadow Minister in the Presidency in the following days.

In the 2020 Register of Members’ Interests, Malatsi revealed that he had received remuneration from the Foschini Group for a sports photo shoot.

On 18 August 2022, Malatsi was appointed as the DA's national spokesperson, succeeding Siviwe Gwarube, who became the new chief whip of the DA's parliamentary caucus.

References

External links
Mr Solly Malatsi – People's Assembly
Mr Mmoba Solomon Malatsi – Parliament of South Africa

Living people
1985 births
Members of the National Assembly of South Africa
Democratic Alliance (South Africa) politicians
People from Limpopo
University of Limpopo alumni
University of the Witwatersrand alumni